Gaston Lane (31 January 1883 – 23 September 1914) was a French rugby union player. He was 1 m 68 cm tall and weighed 68 kg.

He played right wing three quarter (later centre) for Racing club de France and for the French national team; at first he also played for AS Bois-Colombes then for the Paris Cosmopolitan Club.

He played in the first French international and was capped ten times, along with Marcel Communeau.

He was a tradesman. He was killed on the front in Moselle at the start of the First World War.

He was an excellent club rugby player, and also occasionally contributed articles to Sporting.

Career

Club 
 Racing club de France
 Cosmopolitan Club, Paris
 AS Bois-Colombes (initially)

International 
Gaston Lane was first selected for the French national team for the 1 January 1906 match against the All-Blacks, the first French Test match.

Highlights

Club 

 Second place in French national rugby championship, 1912 with Racing club de France, and captain, alongside Géo André and Pierre Failliot, who also played three quarters.

International 
 16 caps.
 1 try (3 points).
 Caps by year: 2 in 1906, 1 in 1907, 2 in 1908, 3 in 1909, 2 in 1910, 2 in 1911, 3 in 1912, 1 in 1913.
 Participated in the first official France match against the All Blacks in their first European tour.
 Captain five times (in 1906, 1910, 1912 & 1913), and captain of the French first XV in the first Five Nations Championship, against Wales at Swansea in 1910 (the second was Marcel Communeau in the next match).
 He was in 4 seasons of the Five Nations Championship in the pre-war period.
 First victory against a Home Nations team, Scotland, in the second French Five Nations Championship, in 1911.

References
 Godwin, Terry Complete Who's Who of International Rugby (Cassell, 1987)

External links
 

1883 births
1914 deaths
Rugby union players from Paris
France international rugby union players
French rugby union players
French military personnel killed in World War I
Rugby union centres
Rugby union wings